This is a list of notable people affiliated with the University of Texas at Arlington.  Since its inception, the university has produced over 200,000 alumni with approximately 130,000 living in the North Texas region.

Notable UTA alumni

Arts and culture

Acting and drama
Charles Baker - actor portraying the character Skinny Pete on Breaking Bad
Annie Ilonzeh - actress, General Hospital and the short-lived ABC reboot of Charlie's Angels
Kristi Kang - voice actress affiliated with Funimation
Lauren Lane - actress, The Nanny
Lou Diamond Phillips - actor, Golden Globe nominee
Morgan Woodward - actor, Golden Boot Award winner for work in Western television and movie genre

Cinema
Daryush Shokof - Iranian filmmaker and political activist

Literature

 Siddharth Katragadda - writer, filmmaker, and artist
Craig Lancaster - novelist

Music
The 440 Alliance - cello rock group, founding members Drew Johnson, Brandon Vanderford, Andrew Walton, Nathan Keefer, and Neil Fong Gilfillan
Mitch Grassi - American singer, songwriter, YouTube personality with Scott Hoying on Superfruit, and in a band called Pentatonix
Ray Price - country and western singer, songwriter, guitarist, and Country Music Hall of Fame inductee
Gene Summers - singer, songwriter, musician, and international recording star; inducted into the Rockabilly Hall of Fame in 1997

Photography

Brad Loper - Pulitzer Prize-winning photographer
Jennifer Thoreson - contemporary artist

Business

Pat Choate - economist, author, and vice-presidential candidate
Roland Fryer (BS '98) - economist, youngest tenured African-American professor in Harvard University's history, and Time Magazines 2009 100 List
Roger Krone (MS '81 Aerospace Engineering) - CEO of Leidos
Kelcy Warren (BS '78 Civil Engineering) - Chairman and CEO of Energy Transfer Partners and 143rd richest American in 2013
Jim Wilkinson (BBA '93) - Managing Partner, International Business and Finance, Brunswick Group LLC; former Chief of Staff for Treasury Secretary Henry M. Paulson

Engineering
 Kalpana Chawla - former NASA astronaut, died in the Space Shuttle Columbia disaster 
 Wendy Okolo - NASA engineer
 Robert L. Stewart - former NASA astronaut and retired Army brigadier general

Government and military

Richard E. Cavazos - first Mexican American four-star general of the United States Army
Tommy Franks - US Army General and Commander-in-Chief of the U.S. Central Command 2000-2003
Michael Langley - first black four-star general of the United States Marine Corps

Politics
Rodney Anderson (BBA '90) - Republican former member of the Texas House of Representatives from Grand Prairie
Cindy Burkett (BA '04 Political Science) - Republican former member of the Texas House of Representatives from Dallas County
Les Eaves - Republican member of the Arkansas House of Representatives since 2015 and businessman from Searcy, Arkansas
Kent Grusendorf - Republican former member of the Texas House of Representatives from Arlington
Sally Kern - former member of the Oklahoma House of Representatives
Bob McFarland - Republican former member of both houses of the Texas State Legislature from Arlington, 1977–1991
Hugh Parmer - former Texas politician and 36th Mayor of Fort Worth
Diane Patrick - Republican former member of the Texas House of Representatives from Arlington
Betsy Price - 44th Mayor of Fort Worth
Kenneth Sheets (BA '01 Political Science) - Republican former member of the Texas House of Representatives for District 107 in Dallas County
Steven Wayne Smith - former justice of the Texas Supreme Court
Wayne Smith (BS Civil Engineering) - Republican former member of the Texas House of Representatives from Harris County
Lupe Valdez - Texas' first Hispanic female nominee for governor and Texas' first Hispanic female sheriff
Royce West - Democratic member of the Texas State Senate
Ann Wynia - former member of the Minnesota House of Representatives and current president of North Hennepin Community College

Sports

 Lanny Bassham - 1976 Summer Olympics gold medalist in 50 m rifle
Kenny Bernstein - drag racing driver and former NASCAR owner; nicknamed the "King of Speed"
 Kaleb Canales - basketball coach; first Mexican-American head coach in NBA history
 Michael Choice - professional baseball player, formerly in MLB; 10th overall draft pick by the Oakland Athletics in the 2010 Major League Baseball Draft
 Bruce Collie - former NFL player
 Jared Connaughton - former Olympic track athlete for Canada
 Scott Cross - basketball coach, former head and assistant men's basketball coach at UTA, and also a former player at UTA
 Roy Dewalt - former Canadian Football League quarterback of the 1980s, mostly with the British Columbia Lions
 Steve Foster - baseball coach and former MLB player for the Cincinnati Reds
 Jinh Yu Frey - professional mixed martial artist and current Invicta FC Atomweight Champion
 Takeshi Fujiwara - Olympic track athlete for Japan and previously El Salvador
 Dillon Gee - former MLB player
Kevin Hervey - professional basketball player
Trey Hillman - baseball coach; Manager of the Kansas City Royals from 2008–2010
John Lackey - former MLB player and three-time World Series champion
 Darryl Lewis - former NFL player
 Mark Lowe - professional baseball player, formerly in MLB
 Tim McKyer - former NFL player and three-time Super Bowl champion
 Adam Moore - professional baseball player, formerly in MLB
Cliff Odom - former NFL football player
 Daniel Ortmeier - former MLB player for the San Francisco Giants
 Dave Owen - former MLB player
Hunter Pence - MLB player
 Mike Rhyner - founder of Sports Radio 1310AM The Ticket in Dallas
 Ryan Roberts - former MLB player
Douglas Russell - 1968 Summer Olympics swimming gold medalist in 100 m butterfly and 4 × 100 m medley relay

Notable faculty and staff 
 Ishfaq Ahmad - Professor of computer science and engineering, IEEE Fellow, and notable researcher in high-performance computing and video coding
 Dale A. Anderson - Professor of aerospace engineering; former Vice President for Research and Dean of Graduate Studies
 Dereje Agonafer - Mechanical Engineering Professor; first home grown member of National Academy of Engineering
 Michael P. Buckley - Director of the Property Repositioning Program
Mo-Shing Chen - Professor Emeritus of Electrical Engineering; Founder and Director of the Energy Systems Research Center, 1968-2003.
 Ramez Elmasri - Associate Chair, Computer Science and Engineering Department, who passed away suddenly on May 14, 2022; he was best known for research that resulted in US Patent 5,440,730, Time Index Access Structure for Temporal Databases Having Concurrent Multiple Versions, with G. Wuu Bellcore, 1995, and related research. 
 George Fix - American mathematician who collaborated on several seminal papers and books in the field of finite element method
 José Ángel Gutiérrez - political science professor, lawyer, and founding member and past president of the La Raza Unida Party.
 Susan Hekman - political science professor and director of the graduate humanities program
 Catheleen Jordan - Professor of social work
 Charles T. McDowell - Professor Emeritus and former director of the Center for Post-Soviet and Eastern European Studies
 Nils O Myklestad - Professor of mechanical and aerospace engineering; an authority on mechanical vibration
David R Nygren - Presidential Distinguished Professor. Experimental particle physicist and member of the National Academy of Sciences. Inventor of the Time Projection Chamber and recipient of the 2018 Marie Curie award of the IEEE. 
 Stanley Palmer - Professor of history; scholar of British history; member of the UT Arlington Academy of Distinguished Teachers (1996)
 Vasant K. Prabhu - electrical engineering professor; IEEE Life Fellow; inventor of communication system designs
 K. R. Rao - electrical engineering professor; IEEE Fellow; inventor of discrete cosine transform
 Allan Saxe - political science professor, author, philanthropist, and award winner for various achievements

References

External links 
The University of Texas at Arlington
University overview
University history
UTAMavericks - fan site
College of Engineering Distinguished Alumni
The University of Texas at Arlington Alumni Relations

University of Texas at Arlington people